This is a list of British billionaires by net worth, based on an annual assessment of wealth and assets compiled by Bloomberg, The Sunday Times, and by Forbes magazine. The lists are incomplete.

2020 British billionaire list by Bloomberg Billionaires Index

2019 British billionaire list by The Sunday Times

2017 British billionaires list by Forbes magazine

See also
 Forbes list of billionaires
 List of countries by the number of billionaires
 Sunday Times Rich List

References

British

Net worth
Worth